The 1975 ICF Canoe Slalom World Championships were held in Skopje, Yugoslavia (in present-day North Macedonia) under the auspices of International Canoe Federation. It was the 14th edition.

Medal summary

Men's

Canoe

Kayak

Mixed

Canoe

Women's

Kayak

Medals table

References
Official results
International Canoe Federation

Icf Canoe Slalom World Championships, 1975
ICF Canoe Slalom World Championships
International sports competitions hosted by Yugoslavia
Icf Canoe Slalom World Championships, 1975
1970s in Skopje
Sports competitions in Skopje
Canoeing and kayaking competitions in Yugoslavia
1975 in the Socialist Republic of Macedonia